Terrabacter is a genus of Gram positive, strictly aerobic, non-sporeforming bacteria. The genus name is derived from Latin terra (earth), referring to the type species' original isolation from soil. The genus was first proposed in 1989; however, the type species Terrabacter tumescens was originally described in 1934, and had previously been classified in the genera Corynebacterium, Arthrobacter, and Pimelobacter. Terrabacter species have been isolated from soil, air and stone.

References

Bacteria genera
Intrasporangiaceae